Mahajananiki Maradalu Pilla is a 1990 Telugu-language comedy film, produced by M. Narasimha Rao under the Raasi Movie Creations banner, directed by Vallabhaneni Janardhan, with Vijaya Bapineedu in direction supervision. It stars Rajendra Prasad and Nirosha , with music composed by Upendra Kumar. The film was a remake of 1989 Kannada film Nanjundi Kalyana. Upendra Kumar, who had composed the songs for the original movie, retained all the six songs from the original.

Plot
Dr. Ram Murthy (Satyanarayana) lives with his brother-in-law Narayana Rao's (Sridhar) family along with his wife Seeta (Subha) and their three daughters. Once, Ram Murthy requires money for medicines for a patient in a serious condition, Narayana Rao refuses and the patient dies, as a result, the family splits in two, Ram Murthy leaves the house with his wife and children. After 20 years, Narayana Rao tells his son Ravi (Rajendra Prasad) what happened, and also says that he and his sister had considered marrying Ravi to his sister's elder daughter Devi (Nirosha). Now Ravi decides to reunite the two families by marrying Devi. He presents himself to his aunt, pretending to be Kishtaiah, his father's younger son, who died 20 years ago. Ram Murthy and his family believe that he is truly Kishthaiah and let him move in with them. Devi is a proud, arrogant woman and is not interested in marriage. Kishtaiah eventually convinces Devi to marry him, and they move back to his village, where he works as a servant in his parents' house. Eventually, Devi loses her arrogant ways and becomes content with her simple life with her husband in their small house. Eventually the truth comes out, Finally, all of them know the truth that Kishtaiah is none other than their nephew Ravi.

Cast
Rajendra Prasad as Ravi / Kishtaiah
Nirosha as Devi
Satyanarayana as Dr. Ram Murthy
Sridhar as Narayana Rao
Rallapalli as Nakkapalli Narayana Swamy
Brahmanandam as Dr. Vyayam Vyagreswara Rao
Maharshi Raghava as Hari
Dora Babu as Giri
Srilakshmi as Aademma
Shubha as Seeta 
Anitha as Ravi's mother
Mamatha as Nakkapalli Rajeswari Devi
Rajitha as Lakshmi
Pavitra as Saraswathi
Nirmalamma as Bamma

Soundtrack

Music was composed by Upendra Kumar. Lyrics were written by Bhuvana Chandra. The music is released on Cauvery Audio Company.

Upendra Kumar retained all the six songs from the original Kannada version which also had music by himself.
 
The song Oka Rama Katha  was the retained version of Hosa Premadali. The song Koka Thadipina  was the retained version of Nijava Nudiyale. The song Espetu Papa  was the retained version of O Nanna Bedagi.
The song Mahajanaaniki Maradalu Pilla  was the retained version of Innu Guarantee. The song Manuve Madhuram  was the retained version of Baduke Hasiru. The song Thappa Thagithe  was the retained version of Olage Seridare Gundu.

References

External links 
 

Indian comedy films
Telugu remakes of Kannada films
Films scored by Upendra Kumar
1990s Telugu-language films